Page City may refer to:

 Page City, Kansas, an unincorporated community in Logan County
 Page City, Missouri, an unincorporated community in Lafayette County